Itay Elkeslassy (born 15 June 1988) is an Israeli football defensive midfielder. He currently plays for Hapoel Kfar Shalem.

Early life
Elkeslassy was born in Netanya, Israel, to a Sephardic Jewish family.

External links 

1988 births
Israeli Sephardi Jews
Living people
Israeli footballers
Hapoel Tel Aviv F.C. players
Hapoel Kfar Saba F.C. players
Hapoel Ra'anana A.F.C. players
Hapoel Rishon LeZion F.C. players
Hapoel Nir Ramat HaSharon F.C. players
Hapoel Petah Tikva F.C. players
Hapoel Afula F.C. players
Maccabi Ahi Nazareth F.C. players
F.C. Kafr Qasim players
Hapoel Kfar Shalem F.C. players
Liga Leumit players
Israeli Premier League players
Footballers from Netanya
Israeli people of Moroccan-Jewish descent
Association football midfielders